Stade Municipal Dr. Edmard Lama is a stadium in Remire-Montjoly, a suburb of Cayenne, French Guiana. The venue was the host stadium for the 2015 CONCACAF Gold Cup qualification (CFU–UNCAF play-off)

References 

Football venues in French Guiana
Buildings and structures in Remire-Montjoly